Fellows of the Royal Society elected in 1922 are listed here.

Fellows 

Thomas Hastie Bryce
Sir Charles Galton Darwin
Stewart Ranken Douglas
Claude Gordon Douglas
Alfred James Ewart
Arthur Hutchinson
Frederick William Lanchester
James Mercer
Samuel Roslington Milner
Marcus Seymour Pembrey
Frank Lee Pyman
George Adolphus Schott
Nevil Vincent Sidgwick
David Meredith Seares Watson
Sir Alfred Fernandez Yarrow

1922
1922 in the United Kingdom
1922 in science